The 1925 Vermont Green and Gold football team was an American football team that represented  the University of Vermont as an independent during the 1925 college football season. In their first year under head coach William McAvoy, the team compiled a 3–6 record.

Schedule

References

Vermont
Vermont Catamounts football seasons
Vermont Catamounts football